Coleophora discordella is a moth of the family Coleophoridae. It was first described by Philipp Christoph Zeller in 1849 and is found in Europe.

Description
The wingspan is about 11–13 mm. Adults are buff or brown with a white costal streak and some other smaller white streaks. Head white, crown sometimes ochreous-tinged. Antennae white, ringed with dark fuscous, basal joint with rather spreading hairs. Forewings shining yellow -ochreous, slightly brownish-tinged ; a white costal streak from base to near apex ; a short fine line in disc, one along fold, and one along dorsum white, often almost obsolete. Hindwings grey..mThey are on wing in July in western Europe.

The larvae feed on common bird's-foot trefoil (Lotus corniculatus), narrowleaf trefoil (Lotus tenuis) and greater bird's-foot-trefoil (Lotus pedunculatus). Young larvae make a narrow winding corridor with much frass in a broad central line. In the end, the corridor widens into an oval blotch, usually close to the leaf margin, out of which the first case is made. The full grown-larva lives in a greyish brown composite leaf case of about 6 mm, attached to the underside of a leaf. The oldest part of the case is bivalved, laterally compressed, and is at an angle of 70° with the anterior part of the case. The mouth angle is about 40°. Full-grown larvae can be found in May.

Distribution
It is found from Fennoscandia to the Iberian Peninsula, Italy and Greece and from Ireland to Poland.

References

External links

discordella
Moths described in 1849
Moths of Europe
Taxa named by Philipp Christoph Zeller